Kaikhali is a locality in Bidhannagar Municipal Corporation of North 24 Paraganas District in the Indian state of West Bengal. It is close to Kolkata Airport and also a part of the area covered by Kolkata Metropolitan Development Authority (KMDA). Bidhannagar Police Commissionerate is responsible for the maintenance of law and order and the locality falls under the Airport Police Station.

Location

Kaikhali is developing into an important residential and commercial centre. Lake Town, Dum Dum Park, Krishnapur (more popularly known as Kestopur), Baguiati, Nagerbazar, Teghoria, Chinar Park, New Town, Salt Lake etc. are the nearby areas of Kaikhali. The population level has been constantly increasing, as has been observed in the rest of the city. This area is highly congested now.

References

Cities and towns in North 24 Parganas district
Neighbourhoods in North 24 Parganas district
Neighbourhoods in Kolkata
Kolkata Metropolitan Area